HMGNC is the eponymous fifth studio album by Indonesian pop band HMGNC, released on October 2, 2017. The album saw the band reunited with its former lead vocalist, Risa Saraswati who left the band in 2009 to pursue her solo career. This is the band’s first album to adopt the HMGNC name since the band changed their name in 2015.

Track listing

Personnel
 Amanda Syachridar - vocals
 Dina Dellyana - synth, programming
 Grahadea Kusuf - synth, programming
 Agung Burgerkill - guest guitars

Release history

References

External links
 HMGNC on Discogs

2017 albums